Adrien-Robert Toussaint (6 November 1904 – 1980) was a French racing cyclist. He rode in the 1923 Tour de France.

References

1904 births
1980 deaths
French male cyclists
Place of birth missing